Bloodstone is an American R&B, soul, and funk group, most popular in the 1970s and early 1980s. The band charted thirteen songs between 1973 and 1984.

Biography
Formed in 1962, in Kansas City, Missouri, the group was a high school doo-wop group called the Sinceres. In 1967 the band was backed by and toured with a large Kansas City horn band known as the Smokin' Emeralds and performed its version of a Motown-style revue, which drew large crowds at a venue called the Place in the Westport district of KC. By 1971, the band consisted of Melvin Webb on drums, Roger Durham (February 14, 1946–July 27, 1973) on percussion, Charles Love on guitar and vocals (born Charles Dee Love, Jr., April 18, 1945, Salina, Kansas; died March 6, 2014, Kansas City, Missouri), Charles McCormick on bass, Harry Williams on percussion, and Willis Draffen on guitar.

After learning to play their respective musical instruments, they moved to Los Angeles, California, where they met their prospective managers George Braunstein and Ron Hamady. The band also replaced its drummer Melvin Webb with Eddie Summers, a resident of Los Angeles. The managers decided to change their name from the Sinceres to Bloodstone. Later the group traveled to London, England where they signed a recording contract with Decca Records. The original members were Charles McCormick, Willis Draffen Jr., Charles Love, Harry Williams, Roger Durham and Eddie Summers. The first album was titled Bloodstone, whereas there were two singles released simultaneously called "That's the Way We Make Our Music", and "Girl (You Look So Fine)", written and arranged by Eddie Summers, the newest member. Its second album, Natural High, reached the US R&B Top 10. The album was written by various members of the group Bloodstone, with the single "Natural High" reaching number 10 on the Pop chart. It received blanket airplay in Europe, particularly on Radio Luxembourg. It reached number 40 on the UK chart in August 1973 and was featured in the Decca "World of Hits" series of compilation albums.

Bloodstone's other hits include "Never Let You Go", "Outside Woman" and "My Little Lady". Bloodstone was instrumental in the "black rock" and funk movement of the 1970s, and even had a hand in the brown-eyed soul movement with some Latin music-tinged hits. Bloodstone performed with Marvin Gaye, Curtis Mayfield, Elton John, and The Impressions. Their 1973 album Natural High, produced by Mike Vernon, sold over one million copies, and was awarded a gold disc by the R.I.A.A. in July that year. They achieved a moderate comeback in the early 1980s with McCormick replacement Ron Wilson. Their album We Go a Long Way Back (1982), whose title track reached the R&B chart Top 5, also produced a follow-up single "Go On and Cry" that reached number 18. The group continued to record into the mid 1980s. They later continued to tour and perform with original members Charles McCormick, Harry Williams and newer member Donald Brown. Bloodstone also starred in and wrote all the music for a film entitled Train Ride to Hollywood (1975).

Roger Durham died on July 27, 1973, at the age of 27 after being thrown off a horse. Founding member Melvin Webb died in 1982. Willis Draffen died on February 8, 2002, at the age of 56. Charles Love died on March 6, 2014, at the age of 68. Love died from complications of pneumonia and had been battling emphysema for several years. Charles McCormick died on April 12, 2022, at the age of 75.

In 2019, Bloodstone was honored with a Lifetime Achievement Award by the National R&B Music Society in Philadelphia.

Members
Current members
Harry Williams – keyboards, vocals (1962–present)
Donald Brown – vocals, guitar (2002–present)

Former members
Charles McCormick – bass, vocals (1962–1982, 1984–2022; died 2022)
Charles Love – vocals, guitar (1962–2014; died 2014)
Willis Draffen – vocals, guitar (1962–2002; died 2002)
Roger Durham – percussion (1962–1973; died 1973)
Melvin Webb – drums (1962–1971; died 1982)
Eddie Summers – vocals, drums, keyboards, music director (1971–1975; died 2022)
Steve Ferrone – drums (1975)
Ron Wilson – bass, vocals (1982–1984)
Ronald D. Bell – drums (1982; died 2020)

Discography

Albums

Singles

References

External links
[ AllMusic Profile].
 
 

African-American musical groups
American soul musical groups
American funk musical groups
American pop music groups
Musical groups established in 1962
Decca Records artists
London Records artists
Motown artists
1962 establishments in Missouri